Stefan Haenni (born 4 August 1958 in Thun) is a Swiss painter and a crime novel writer.

Biography 
Stefan Haenni visited the Schule für Gestaltung in Bern and studied at the University of Bern and the Université de Fribourg history of art and psychology. With his painting Haenni reached in the 1980 first appreciations. He realized among other things works with the portraits from the Nobelprice winner Nagib Machfus and the surrealistic Swiss painter Meret Oppenheim.
The leading subject of modern oriental painting reached Haenni after a trip along the Nile in 1990. Many works were created after that like West-östlicher Divan from Goethe, the series of Monde Arabe and Lawrence of Arabia – new paintings about an old film. "Haenni's paintings live from affection for the world of the Orient without denying their anchoring in Western culture and are such important messengers of international understanding as no other Swiss artist has to show in this perseverance and at the same time lightheartedness." His works are collected in several Swiss Museums of Modern Art, Swiss Banks (BEKB, Credit Suisse, UBS) and private Art-Collections.

Since 2009 Stefan Haenni has also written five crime novels about the Thun private detective Hanspeter Feller (Gmeiner Verlag). The first three novels Narrentod, Brahmsrösi and Scherbenhaufen form the Thun Crime Trilogy, in which the court jester [[Karl the Bold| Charles the Bold as Fulehung, Johannes Brahms with the Thun Sonata or Heinrich von Kleist with the broken jug were at the center of the plot. The crime novel Tellspielopfer is about a robbery murder in the area of the Tellspiele Interlaken. Berner Bärendreck tells the story of a Bernese patrician who gets into trouble because of a painting by Ferdinand Hodler. Todlerone in 2021 is a collection of 24 shortstories playing in the Bernese Oberland. With the anthology Zürihegel in 2022, he expanded the murderous radius into the Zurich Oberland.

Stefan Haenni lives in Thun/Switzerland.

Exhibitions (selection) 
 1979, 1985: Weihnachtsausstellung, Kunstmuseum Thun
 1984: Stefan Haenni, Galerie Wendeltreppe, Schloss Schadau, Thun/Switzerland
 1985: Young artists, Volkswirtschaftskammer from the Berner Oberland, Interlaken
 1988: Milkproject, Intermilch, Ostermundigen
 1988: Vernissage without works, Galerie am Kreis, Bern
 1989: People and Portraits, Swiss Institute Contemporary Art New York
 1990: Projekt Querschnitt, Kinomuseum Moskau
 1991: Projekt Querschnitt, Freiraum Helmkestrasse, Hannover
 1991: Querschnitt – the Printedition, Weisser Saal, Museum of modern art, Bern/Switzerland
 1992: Querschnitt ist tot - es lebe der Querschnitt, Kunstmuseum Thun
 1995: Mannsbilder – Frauenzimmer (Sylvie Fleury, Urs Stooss, David Hockney, Stefan Haenni), Galerie Martin Krebs, Bern
 1997: New pictures from Aegypt, Galerie Martin Krebs, Bern
 1997: From the beginning of art, museum of modern art Olten/Switzerland
 1999: Konnex Kairo, Stefan Haenni, Not Vital a.o., Museum of modern art Thun/Switzerland
 1999: The promised Rosegarden, Galerie Martin Krebs, Bern
 2006: From the Niesen to the pyramids, Galerie Martin Krebs, Bern
 2008: Orient and Okzident, Villa Schüpbach, Art Collection Steffisburg
 2009: Durch die Blume (Flower view), Samuel Buri, Stefan Haenni, Shirina Shabhazi, Galerie Martin Krebs, Bern
 2013: A bed of roses, Stefan Haenni, Ottmar Hörl, David Hockney, Galerie Martin Krebs, Bern
 2013: Dazzling, New pictures and tondos, Galerie Martin Krebs, Bern
 2015: United Colors, Jim Avignon, Stefan Haenni, Teruko Yokoi, a.o., Galerie Martin Krebs, Bern
 2018: Printemps oriental, Galerie Hodler, Thun

Crime novels 
 Narrentod. Fellers erster Fall. Gmeiner, Messkirch 2009, .
 Brahmsrösi. Fellers zweiter Fall. Gmeiner, Messkirch 2010, .
 Scherbenhaufen. Fellers dritter Fall. Gmeiner, Messkirch 2011, .
 Berner Bärendreck. Fellers vierter Fall. Gmeiner, Messkirch 2019, .
 Tellspielopfer. Fellers fünfter Fall. Gmeiner, Messkirch 2020, .
 Todlerone. Winterkrimis. Gmeiner, Messkirch 2020, .
 Zürihegel. Winterkrimis. Gmeiner, Messkirch, 2022, .

References

This article was initially translated from the German Wikipedia.

Bibliography 
 Schweizerisches Institut für Kunstwissenschaft (Hrsg.): Künstlerverzeichnis der Schweiz 1980–1990. Huber, Frauenfeld 1991.
 Schweizerisches Institut für Kunstwissenschaft (Hrsg.): Biographisches Lexikon der Schweizer Kunst. Verlag Neue Zürcher Zeitung, Zürich 1998, Band 1.
 Steffan Biffiger: Stefan Haenni: Orient und Okzident – Mit Werkverzeichnis Malerei 1978 bis 2008. ArchivArte, Bern 2008, .
 Christoph Geiser: Stefan Haenni: Der Aegyptenzyklus. Galerie Martin Krebs, Bern 1998.
 Andreas Langenbacher: Dromedar und Ketzerkönig. In: Stefan Haenni: Kunstmuseum Thun, 24. September bis 1. November 1992. Museum of Modern Art Thun, Thun 1992.
 Hans Christoph von Tavel: Stefan Haenni: Barocklahoma. Ausstellungskatalog, Galerie Martin Krebs, Bern 1994.
 Franziska Streun: Thun – Ein Lesebuch, Zytglogge Verlag, Bern 2014, p. 100/101. 
 Paul Ott: Mord im Alpenglühen, Der Schweizer Kriminalroman - Geschichte und Gegenwart, Chronos Verlag, Zürich 2020, p. 223/224.

External links 
 
 
 Stefan Haenni bei artnet
  Stefan Haenni currency designs swissmint for the Swiss National Bank

1958 births
Living people
20th-century Swiss painters
Swiss male painters
21st-century Swiss painters
21st-century Swiss male artists
Swiss male novelists
Swiss writers in German
Swiss contemporary artists
21st-century Swiss novelists
People from Bern-Mittelland District
Swiss-German people
Currency designers
Artists from Bern
21st-century male writers
People from Thun
20th-century Swiss male artists
Writers from Bern